Andrea Hlaváčková and Lucie Hradecká were the defending champions, but decided not to compete together. Hradecká partnered with Barbora Krejčíková, but lost in the quarterfinals to Bianca Andreescu and Carson Branstine. Hlaváčková partnered with Tímea Babos and successfully defended her title, defeating Andreescu and Branstine 6–3, 6–1 in the final.

Seeds

Draw

References
Main Draw

Coupe Banque Nationale
Tournoi de Québec
2017 in Canadian tennis